Loreak, released in the US as Flowers, is a 2014 Basque-language Spanish drama film directed by Jon Garaño and Jose Mari Goenaga.

It premiered in the Official Section of the 2014 San Sebastián International Film Festival, and was also screened at the 2014 BFI London Film Festival, the 2014 Zurich Film Festival, the 2014 Tokyo International Film Festival and the 2015 Palm Springs International Film Festival.

It became the first Basque language film nominated for the Goya Award for Best Film. It was selected as the Spanish entry for the Best Foreign Language Film at the 88th Academy Awards, being the first Basque language film to do it, but it was not nominated.

Plot
Ane (played by Nagore Aranburu) is a woman in her early forties who does not feel fulfilled. Her life changes when she starts to receive bouquets of flowers at home anonymously, once a week. The lives of Lourdes (Itziar Ituño) and Tere (Itziar Aizpuru) are also altered by some mysterious flowers. A stranger leaves flowers every week in memory of someone who was important for them.

Cast
Nagore Aranburu as Ane
Itziar Ituño as Lourdes
Itziar Aizpuru as Tere
Josean Bengoetxea as Beñat
Egoitz Lasa as Ander
Ane Gabarain as Jaione
José Ramón Soroiz as Txema
Jox Berasategi as Jexus

Critical reception
Loreak was met with positive reviews by critics. Jonathan Holland of The Hollywood Reporter praised it for being "as beguiling and beautifully structured as the flowers of its title" and said it "absolutely deserves wider exposure". Jay Weissberg of Variety called the film "beautifully cast" and "an affecting story of loss and the ways people cope". Lluís Bonet Mojica of La Vanguardia, who gave Loreak a five-star review, noted that it is a "film where nothing happens and everything happens". Oti Rodríguez Marchante of ABC described the film as a "moving and delicate melodrama". On the mixed side, Andrea G. Bermejo of Cinemanía gave Loreak 3.5 stars out of five and observed that "by means of so much perfection [...] the result loses some spontaneity, some audacity, and perhaps, some weight".

Awards and nominations

See also
 List of submissions to the 88th Academy Awards for Best Foreign Language Film
 List of Spanish submissions for the Academy Award for Best Foreign Language Film

References

External links
 Review on THR
 

2014 films
Spanish drama films
Basque-language films
2014 drama films